State Route 32 (SR 32), also known as the James A. Rhodes Appalachian Highway, is a major east–west highway across the southern portion of the U.S. state of Ohio. It is the eighth longest state route in Ohio, spanning southern Ohio from Cincinnati to Belpre, across the Ohio River from Parkersburg, West Virginia. Except in Belpre, leading up to the bridge into West Virginia, the entire route outside Cincinnati's beltway (Interstate 275, I-275) is a high-speed four-lane divided highway, forming the Ohio portion of Corridor D of the Appalachian Development Highway System.

Route description
SR 32 begins at a junction with Columbia Parkway (U.S. Route 50, US 50) in eastern Cincinnati, near the border between the neighborhoods of Linwood, Mount Lookout, and Columbia-Tusculum, in the area of Lunken Field. It follows Beechmont Avenue, running concurrently with SR 125, until it crosses the Little Miami River, where it turns north on Batavia Road and continues past Newtown.

At the Clermont County line, the road becomes the Appalachian Highway, a four-lane, limited-access divided highway that is part of Corridor D. Between I-275 and Mount Orab, the highway alternates between at-grade and grade-separated interchanges. In Pike County, it runs concurrently with SR 772, then with SR 124. Next, it intersects the ramps to US 23 in Piketon.

There is an unusual interchange configuration near Jackson at US 35, which is an expressway in both directions. Each highway has ramps that exit to the other highway, with right-turning traffic merging onto the second highway, but left-turning traffic coming to an at-grade intersection. Both highways end up having at-grade intersections, albeit with a grade separation of the main highway corridors. This interchange type is sometimes termed a "windmill" interchange, but it is not related to the interchange type of the same name. This junction is the only interchange of its type known to exist in the world.

SR 124 departs at Roads. US 50 rejoins SR 32 in front of the Gordon K. Bush Airport in Albany. The two routes briefly run concurrently with US 33 in Athens.

Near Coolville, SR 7 joins from the south. Just before Belpre, US 50 and Corridor D turn south, crossing the Ohio River on the Blennerhassett Island Bridge toward Parkersburg, West Virginia. SR 32 and the Appalachian Highway continue eastward through Belpre. The Appalachian Highway ends just west of the Ohio River; SR 7 turns north, remaining a limited-access divided highway, while SR 32 continues as a surface street for a few blocks until meeting the Memorial Bridge, a toll bridge across the Ohio River into Parkersburg.

History
The Batavia Turnpike and Miami Bridge Company was incorporated and chartered by the state of Ohio. It built a road, which was "about finished" as of 1841, beginning at the Wooster Turnpike (Eastern Avenue), crossing the Little Miami River on the Union Bridge, and turning east to Batavia. The Ohio Turnpike to Bethel split after the Little Miami was crossed.

The passage of the McGuire Bill in 1911 led to the designation of a large number of Inter-County Highways to be maintained by the Ohio Department of Highways. This network included the Cincinnati-Batavia Road (Inter-County Highway 41, ICH 41) and Batavia-Winchester Road (ICH 125), connecting Cincinnati to Batavia, Williamsburg, Mt. Orab, Sardinia, Winchester, and beyond to an intersection with the West Union-Belfast Road (ICH 122) south of Seaman (where Graces Run Road now meets SR 247). This entire route from Cincinnati to south of Seaman was designated and signed as State Route 74 in 1923. The route left downtown Cincinnati on Eastern Avenue, shared with SR 7 (now US 52) and SR 25 (now SR 125). SR 7 left at Davis Lane (now Airport Road), while SR 25 and SR 74 turned onto Beechmont Avenue, splitting after crossing the Little Miami River. By 1925, the eastern end of SR 74 had been realigned and extended, heading east from Winchester through Seaman and continuing through Peebles to SR 73 northwest of Rarden; the old alignment (Graces Run Road) reverted to local control. Along with US 50, US 52, and SR 125, SR 74 was moved to Columbia Parkway in the early 1940s, and in the early 1950s it was removed from downtown Cincinnati to its present terminus. Due to the existence of I-74 west of Cincinnati, the number was changed to SR 32 in 1962; SR 74 signs were removed in June 1963 after a period of dual signage. The designation had originally been applied to a route running from the Indiana border west of Celina to Marysville; in 1938 it was replaced by US 33 east of St. Marys, and a rerouted SR 54, later SR 29, to the west.

The state relocated the road between Mount Carmel and Batavia as a four-lane divided highway in the early 1960s, several years after the parallel SR 125 was widened (but not realigned). Because this was done before or during the renumbering, the old road here is known as Old State Route 74, rather than Old State Route 32 to the east. Improvement of the rest of the road did not take place until after it was added to the Appalachian Development Highway System in 1965. This proposed Appalachian Highway—part of Corridor D—was to run across the southern part of the state from I-275 outside Cincinnati to Belpre. From the east end of SR 32 east of Peebles, the route was to continue northeast, joining SR 772 near Elmgrove, and following SR 124 beyond Jackson to Roads. After continuing northeast to Radcliff, it would parallel SR 346 and a portion of SR 143, merging with US 50 west of Albany and following it past Athens and Coolville to Belpre. A never-built branch, planned as part of Corridor B, would have followed SR 73 and SR 348 from east of Peebles to Lucasville on US 23 (Corridor C).

In 1998, the Ohio Department of Transportation (ODOT) inspected a section of SR 32 in Jackson County due to repeated pavement failure and pothole subsidence featured in the median. Abandoned underground mines were visible near the roadway, but there were no mine maps available for the area. An electrical resistivity tomography was conducted to see if there were mine voids underneath the roadway. Work to repair the roadway was completed in March 1999.

In 2002, two interchanges were constructed along SR 32. Olive Branch–Stonelick Road intersection in Clermont County was constructed into an interchange. The $7 million project (equivalent to $ in ) was jointly funded by Clermont County and ODOT's Transportation Review Advisory Council (TRAC). The interchange project was awarded the Donald C. Schramm Award by the American Society of Highway Engineers (ASHE) Triko Valley Section in 2002. Work also began on replacing two at-grade intersections of SR 124 and SR 327 into a single interchange near Wellston in Jackson County. The $9 million project (equivalent to $ in ) was funded jointly by the Federal Highway Safety Infrastructure program and ODOT's Highway Safety Program (HSP).

Future
The portion of SR 32 in Clermont, Brown, Highland, Adams, and Pike counties was under consideration as the eastward continuation of I-74 from Cincinnati to Piketon in 1991, where it would have connected with I-73 as part of the North-South I-73/I-74 Corridor created in the Intermodal Surface Transportation Efficiency Act (ISTEA) of 1991. Heavy local opposition in the late 1990s to build I-74 through Cincinnati and I-73 around Columbus and north through Michigan forced ODOT to cancel any further plans to extend I-74 east of Cincinnati or I-73 from Portsmouth and Columbus to Toledo through Ohio.

A construction project that is a part of the Eastern Corridor, is redesigning SR 32 from I-275 to Batavia. This segment of construction began in 2012. The plan is to remove all signalized intersections east of I-275 and eventually replace it with a limited-access highway to Batavia. Funding for the final segments, which call for the construction of interchanges at Glen Este-Withamsville and Bach-Buxton Roads, amounts to $83.1 million (equivalent to $ in ). The project funding was awarded in November 2019 with construction beginning in 2021. The Consolidated Appropriations Act signed into law in December 2022 also provided funding.

A feasibility study is underway at the Brooks-Malott Road intersection in Mt. Orab. The study calls for the construction of an interchange.

Major intersections

References

External links

032
SR 032
SR 032
SR 032
SR 032
SR 032
SR 032
SR 032
SR 032
SR 032
SR 032
SR 032
Roads in Cincinnati